The 2006 Shreveport mayoral election resulted in the election of Democrat Cedric Glover who defeated Republican Jerry Jones in the runoff in the open race to succeed outgoing mayor Keith Hightower. The nonpartisan blanket primary was held on September 30, 2006, and as no candidate obtained the required majority, the general election followed on November 7, 2006.

Results

|}

|}

References

Shreveport
Government of Shreveport, Louisiana
2006 Louisiana elections
November 2006 events in the United States